This is an index of family trees available on the English Wikipedia. It includes noble, politically important, and royal families as well as fictional families and thematic diagrams. This list is organized according to alphabetical order.

Americas

Brazil
 Brazilian Imperial Family

Canada
 Bronfman family
 Hart family, (professional wrestling)
 Family of Snorri Thorfinnson, first European born in the Americas
 Family tree of Thomson family

Mexico
Mexican emperors
Aztec emperors family tree

Nicaragua
 Family tree of Chamorro

Peru
Sapa Inca Dynasty, Rulers of Cuzco and the Inca Empire

United States
 Adams family (U.S. politics)
 Astor family (U.S. politics/U.K. peerage)
 Bush family (U.S. politics)
 Coppola family
 Dummer family
 Du Pont family
 Hilton family
 Kennedy family (U.S. politics)
 Kohler family
 Mathews family (U.S. politics)
 McMahon family
 Rockefeller family
 Roosevelt family (U.S. politics)
 Taft family  (U.S. politics)
 Udall family (U.S. politics)
 Vanderbilt family
 Walton family
 Barbelo family

Asia

Bangladesh
 Ispahani family
 Sheikh–Wazed family

Brunei
 Brunei

Cambodia
 Khmer Empire
 Cambodian monarchs' family tree, current and past
 House of Sisowath

China

Chinese dynasties

 Ancient (from the Three Sovereigns and Five Emperors to the Spring and Autumn period)
 Eastern Zhou
 Five Emperors
 Shang
 Western Zhou
 Xia
 Warring States
 Early (from the Qin dynasty to the Sixteen Kingdoms)
 Cao Wei
 Cheng Han
 Eastern Han
 Eastern Jin
 Eastern Wu
 Former Liang
 Former Qin
 Former Yan
 Han Zhao
 Hu Xia
 Later Liang
 Later Qin
 Later Yan
 Later Zhao
 Northern Liang
 Northern Yan
 Qin
 Shu Han
 Southern Liang
 Southern Yan
 Western Han
 Western Jin
 Western Liang
 Western Qin
 Xin
 Middle (from the Northern and Southern dynasties to end of the Southern Song)
 Chen
 Eastern Wei
 Former Shu
 Jin
 Jingnan
 Later Han
 Later Jin
 Later Liang
 Later Shu
 Later Tang
 Later Zhou
 Liang
 Liao
 Liu Song
 Ma Chu
 Min
 Northern Han
 Northern Qi
 Northern Song
 Northern Wei
 Northern Zhou
 Southern Han
 Southern Qi
 Southern Song
 Southern Tang
 Sui
 Tang
 Western Liao
 Western Wei
 Western Xia
 Wuyue
 Wu Zhou
 Yang Wu
 Late (from the Yuan dynasty to the Qing dynasty)
 Later Jin
 Ming
 Northern Yuan
 Qing
 Southern Ming
 Yuan

Non-monarchical
 Main line of descent from Confucius

India
 Tata family
 Birla family
 Mughal emperors
 Descent of Mughal Dynasty from Tamerlane and Genghis Khan
 Sikh gurus
 Rajas of Pratapgarh
 Nizam Shahi dynasty
 Qutb Shahi dynasty

Princely states 
 Travancore royal family
 Maharaja of Mysore
 Nizam of Hyderabad
 Maharaja of Jammu and Kashmir
 Maharaja of Baroda
 Nawab of Bhopal
 Maharaja of Tripura

Indonesia 
 Yogyakarta Sultanate

Iran 
 Achaemenid dynasty (550–330 BC)
 Seleucid Empire (312 - 63 BC)
 Arsacid dynasty (247 BC – AD 224)
 Sasanid dynasty (224–651

Iranian Intermezzo
Tahirid
Ziyarid
Ghurid

Modern Iran
 Safavid dynasty (1501–1722/1736)
 Afsharid dynasty (1736–1796)
 Zand dynasty (1750–1794)
 Qajar dynasty (1781–1925)
 Pahlavi dynasty (1925–1979)

Israel 
 Kings of Israel and Judah
 Herzog family

Japan

Imperial family, nobility and shoguns
Japanese Emperors family tree
Fujiwara family tree
Fujiwara Clan (template)
Soga clan
Taira clan
Seiwa Genji/Minamoto clan, shōguns of Japan 
Hōjō clan
Kamakura shōguns and Hōjō shikken
Ashikaga clan (Ashikaga shogunate)
Oda clan and Toyotomi clan
Tokugawa clan (Tokugawa shogunate)
Ryukyu Kingdom

Daimyō

Tokugawa branches
Lords of Fukui (Echizen)
Lords of Matsue (cadet of the Fukui-Echizen line)
Lords of Maebashi (cadet of the Fukui-Echizen line)
Lords of Tsuyama (cadet of the Fukui-Echizen line)
Lords of Akashi (cadet of the Fukui-Echizen line)
Lords of Owari
Lords of Kishū
Lords of Mito
Lords of Takamatsu (cadet of the Mito line)
Lords of Kuwana (cadet of the Mito line)
Lords of Shimabara (cadet of the Mito line)
Lords of Takasu (cadet of the Mito line)
Lords of Iyo-Matsuyama

Others

Lords of Chōshū
Lords of Fukuoka
Lords of Hiroshima
Lords of Kaga
Lords of Kubota
Lords of Kumamoto
Lords of Kurume
Lords of Morioka
Lords of Okayama
Lords of Saga
Lords of Satsuma
Lords of Sendai
Lords of Shōnai
Lords of Tokushima
Lords of Tosa
Lords of Tottori
Lords of Tsu
Lords of Tsushima-Fuchū
Lords of Yonezawa

Korea 
 Balhae
 Baekje
Goguryeo
 Silla
 Goryeo
 Joseon

Malaysia
 Kedah Sultanate
 Kelantan Sultanate
 Johor Sultanate
 House of Negeri Sembilan
 Pahang Sultanate
 Perak Sultanate
 Perlis Sultanate
 House of Singapura-Melakan
 Selangor Sultanate
 Terengganu Sultanate

Middle East

Ancient
 Yamhad dynasty
 Sargonid Assyria
 Chaldean Babylon
Medieval
 Kings of Jerusalem
Modern
 House of Saud (rulers of Saudi Arabia)
 House of Al-Sabah (emirs of Kuwait)
Hashemites dynasty of Jordan

Mongolia
 1206–1635: The House of Borjigin
Family tree of the Ilkhans (House of Hulagu)
Timurid Dynasty of Tamerlane
Descent of Mughal Dynasty from Tamerlane and Genghis Khan

Myanmar

Pagan Kingdom
Myinsaing Kingdom
Pinya Kingdom
Sagaing Kingdom
Kingdom of Ava
Prome Kingdom
Hanthawaddy Kingdom
Kingdom of Mrauk U
Taungoo Dynasty
Konbaung Dynasty

Sri Lanka 
 House of Vijaya
 House of Lambakanna I
 House of Moriya
 House of Lambakanna II
 House of Vijayabahu
 House of Kalinga
 House of Sri Sanga Bo
 House of Dinajara
 Nayaks of Kandy

Thailand 
 Chakri dynasty
 Thai monarchs' family tree

Turkey 
 Ottoman sultans simplified
 Ottoman sultans more detailed 
 Ottoman princes today (Osmanoğlu family)

Classical Anatolia
 Hittite
 Lysimachid
 Cappadocia
 Pontus
 Pergamon
 Bithynia

Turkic sultans
 Seljuk 
 Ghaznavid
 Anushtiginid

Vietnam
 Vietnamese monarchs

Other
 Spartocids (Kingdom of the Bosporus)
 Bhutto family (modern Pakistan)

Africa

Egypt
 First Dynasty
 Fourth Dynasty
 Eleventh Dynasty
 Twelfth Dynasty
 Eighteenth Dynasty
 Nineteenth Dynasty
 Twentieth Dynasty
 Twenty-first Dynasty
 Twenty-sixth Dynasty
 Ptolemy's family tree (Macedonian Egypt)
 Muhammad Ali Dynasty

Ethiopia
 Ethiopian emperors

Madagascar
 Imerina

Tunisia
 Husainid dynasty

Zanzibar
 Sultans of Zanzibar

South Africa
 Xhosa
 Zulu

Europe

Ancient Rome

Aristocratic families 

 The Aurelii Cottae
 The Caecilii Metellii
 The Cornelii Scipiones
 The Julii Caesares
 The Marcii Philippi
 The Octavii Rufi (paternal family of Augustus)

Imperial dynasties 

Roman Emperors family tree (collection of simplified Imperial Roman family trees)
Julio-Claudian dynasty (27 BC – 68 AD)
Flavian dynasty (69 – 117 AD)
Nerva–Antonine dynasty (96 - 192 AD)
Severan dynasty (193 – 235 AD)
Constantinian dynasty (305 – 383 AD)
Valentinianic dynasty (364 – 392 AD)

Armenia
 Orondid

Austria
Babenberger Family Tree
Von Graben family (Austrian)
Habsburg family (Austrian)
House of Habsburg
Hitler family

Belgium
Dukes of Brabant
Counts of Flanders
Counts and dukes of Guelders
Counts of Hainaut
Kings of Belgium, in French, List in French

Bohemia
Kings of Bohemia family tree
Přemyslid dynasty and Premyslid Dynasty Family Tree (picture)

Bosnia

Royal
 Boričević dynasty
 Kulinić dynasty
Kings of Bosnia

Noble families
 Hrvatinić noble family
 Kosača noble family
 Radinović-Pavlović noble family
 Radojević-Mirković noble family
 Zlatonosović noble family
 Dinjčića-Kovačević noble family
 Sanković noble family
 Radivojević noble family
 Nikolić noble family
 Miloradović noble family
 Ljubibratić noble family
 Branivojević noble family

Bulgaria
Krum's dynasty
Cometopuli dynasty
Asen dynasty
 Terter dynasty
 Shishman dynasty

Croatia
Princes of Bribir
Princes of Krk
Princes of Zrin
Trpimirović Royal Family

France

Royals
Kings of France
Kings of France (simple) (includes Merovingians, Carolingians, and Capetians)
Emperors of the French (House of Bonaparte)
Kings of Navarre
House of Bourbon (simplified)
Genealogy of Descent of the Bourbons from Henry IV 
House of Blois Counts of Blois, Champagne, Sancerre, Boulogne, Aumale, Kings of Navarre, King of England

Noble Houses

Ingelgeriens (en), counts of Anjou, ancestors of the Plantagenets
House of Châteaudun, viconts of Châteaudun and counts of Perche, direct ancestors of the Plantagenets.
Rorgonides, ancestors of the House of Châteaudun
House of Baux - Lords of Baux
House of La Fayette - Motier de la Fayette, called "Lafayette"  
House of Bourbon (French)
Genealogy of the direct Capetians (fr)
Genealogy of the Royal House of France (fr)
Capetian House of Courtenay
Family Tree of the Valois, Medicis and Bourbons (French)
Family Tree of the Bourbons to Henry IV (French)
Relationships of dynasties to the Bourbons(French)
House of Anjou-Sicily, Counts of Provence, Kings of Naples, Kings of Hungary (simple) and (detailed)

Princes
Princes of Conde
Princes of Conti

Dukes and Counts
Dukes of Aquitaine
Dukes of Brittany and (in French)
Dukes of Burgundy
Duke of Normandy (picture), and House of Normandy (chart)
Dukes of Lorraine
Counts of Provence

Georgia
Kings of Iberia
Kings of Georgia
Kings of Kartli
Kings of Kakheti
Kings of Imereti

Germany

Royal
German monarchs family tree (843-1918)
Merovingian dynasty 
Kings of Germany (Carolingian, Ottonian, Salian and Hohenstaufen dynasties) (picture)

Habsburg family (Austrian)
Habsburg Family Tree
House of Wittelsbach (Kings and Dukes of Bavaria, Electoral Counts Palatine of the Rhine, Counts of Holland)
House of Luxembourg, counts and dukes of Luxembourg, kings of Bohemia, and German Emperors
House of Welf Kings of Burgundy, Dukes of Bavaria, Saxony & Brunswick, Electors & Kings of Hanover, branch of the House of Este
Genealogy of the House of Welf
Genealogy List of the House of Hesse (German)
Counts and dukes of Guelders
House of Wettin, Dukes, Electors & Kings of Saxony
Saxe-Coburg and Gotha

Dukes
Dukes of Swabia (House of Hohenstaufen)
Dukes of Lorraine

Others
Bach family important in the history of music for nearly two hundred years, with several notable composers, the best-known of whom was Johann Sebastian Bach
Rothschild family

Greece
Atreus - House of Atreus - of the Greek Heroic age, family of Agamemnon and Menelaus
Erechtheid dynasty mythological kings of Athens, also here
Heraclidae Kings of Sparta 
Argead Dynasty, family of Philip II of Macedonia and Alexander the Great
Kings of the Hellenes
Kings of the Hellenes, simple (French)
Alcmaeonids noble house of Ancient Athens, family of Pericles and Alcibiades
Byzantine emperors family tree

Hungary
Kings of Hungary family tree

Ireland
Uí Fiachrach (Irish)
Uí Néill (Irish)
Uí Ímair
 Northern Uí Néill

Italy
Neapolitan monarchs
Sicilian monarchs
Visconti Family, Dukes of Milan
Sforza Family, Dukes of Milan
Farnese, Dukes of Parma
Gonzaga Family, Marquesses and Dukes of Mantua
House of Este and here, duke of Ferrara, Modena, and Reggio
House of Savoy (in Italian) or here (in French)
House of Medici 
Borgia family
Della Rovere

Luxembourg
Grand Ducal Family of Luxembourg

Monaco
Princes of Monaco
House of Grimaldi

Netherlands
Monarchs of the Netherlands
Princes of Orange and Kings/Queens of the Netherlands or here
Dukes of Brabant
Counts of Flanders
Counts and dukes of Guelders
Counts of Holland
Counts of Hainaut
House of De Graeff family tree

Poland
Family tree of Polish monarchs
 Piast
 Piast-Silesia
 Jagiellon

Portugal
Kings of Portugal
Descent of Present Duke of Braganza

Romania
 Romanian Royal House - Hohenzollern-Sigmaringen

Russia
Rulers of Russia family tree
Summary Family Tree of the Romanov dynasty

Serbia
Karađorđević family tree and here
Nemanjić family tree
Crnojević family tree
Balšić family tree
Branković family tree
Lazarević family tree
Vojislavljević family tree
Vlastimirović family tree

Scandinavia
Kings of Denmark
Present Danish Royal Family
House of Knýtlinga ( "House of Cnut's Descendants" but known in Denmark as house of Gorm the Old)
House of Estridsen
Royal descendants of Queen Victoria and King Christian IX
Genealogical Tree/Stammtræ of the Danish House of Oldenburg/Oldenborg and Glucksburg/Glucksborg
Oldenborg dynasty family tree (in Czech), shows relationships between branches of Oldenburg dynasty, i.e. the Kings of Denmark, the Czars of Russia, Kings of Sweden, the Kings of Greece, the Kings of Norway.
Canute the Great's family tree
Kings of Norway family tree
Modern Norwegian Royal Family
Kings of Sweden
Kings of Sweden of the House of Vasa
Kings of Sweden of the House of Bernadotte
Ynglings - semi-legendary clan supposed progenitor of the Fairhairs and the Munsö

Spain
 Kings of Spain 
 Kings of Aragon
 Kings of Asturias
 Kings of Castile
 Kings of Leon
 Kings of Navarre
 Visigothic Kingdom
 Counts of Barcelona and Kings of Aragon (simple)
 House of Trastámara
 All kings of all Spanish kingdoms

United Kingdom
House of Wessex, Kings of England and House of Wessex from Alfred
Kings of Northumbria
Kings of Mercia 
Kings of East Anglia (519–749)
Kings of Scotland (834–1603)
Princes of Wales (c. 450 – 1719)
House of Aberffraw, Princes of Wales
United Kingdom Kings
House of Godwin
Normans, Plantagenets, House of York, House of Lancaster, House of Tudor (simplified version) (1066–1603)
Plantagenet family tree (simple)
Edward III's claim to the French throne
Lancasters and Yorks in the Wars of the Roses
House of Lancaster from 1267-1471 (simple) and (French)
House of York from 1341-1485 (simple) and (French)
Houses of Lancaster and York during the Wars of the Roses
House of Beaufort, dukes of Somerset, cadet branch of the house of Lancaster
Somerset family tree: Earls & Marquesses of Worcester, Dukes of Beaufort (illegitimate Plantagenets)
Holland Family, earls and dukes of Kent and Exeter and their connections
House of Tudor and the Wars of the Roses (simplified)
House of Tudor and Plantagenet showing relationship with Cromwells
House of Stuart, House of Hanover, House of Windsor (1603–now)
Jacobite succession (clickable) Jacobite succession (picture)
Royal descendants of Queen Victoria and King Christian IX
Family Tree of Stewart/Stuart Family
Family Tree of Stewart of Darnley and Dukes of Lennox
Family Tree of Stuart Dukes of Albany
Family Tree of Dukes of Richmond
Family Tree of Marquesses of Bute
FitzAlan Family, Earls of Arundel and their relationship to the Stuarts.
Family Tree of Earls of Munster
Family tree of the British royal family
House of Tudor Patrimonial/Welsh Lineage
House of Bebbanburgh ealdorman and high-reeve of Bebbanburgh (now Bamburgh)
Howard family, Dukes of Norfolk (picture) and Dukes of Norfolk (clickable)
de Clare,  descendants of Richard I, Duke of Normandy's, Earls of Pembroke, Glamorgan, Hertford and Gloucester, etc.
House of de Vere, earls of Oxford
House of Courtenay, Earls of Devon and here (clickable)
House of Neville(en) and (fr) herewith tree, earls of Westmorland, Warwick, Bergavenny, etc.
House of Percy, Earls of Northumberland, Dukes of Northumberland, "Kings in the North"
Le Despenser Family barons le Despenser, earls of Winchester, Despenser(in Italian)
Dukes of Marlborough from the Churchill and Spencer family
Spencer Modern (in Italian) and Spencer Peers (in Italian)
Hamilton dukes of Abercorn and dukes of Hamilton
Herbert family, earls of Pembroke, Carnarvon, and Powis, Barons Herbert, Baron Herbert of Chirbury, Earl of Torrington
Cecil, Earls and Marquesses of Salisbury
Earls and Dukes of Portland from the Bentinck family
Earls of Lincoln and Dukes of Newcastle
Leveson-Gower & Egerton Family Tree: Earls Gower, Marquesses of Stafford, Dukes of Sutherland
Rich family, earls of Warwick
Fox family earls of Ilchester
Barons Byron (family of the poet Lord Byron)
Charles Darwin's family
J.R.R. Tolkien's family
Keynes family
Lanier family
Astor family (U.K. peerage/U.S. politics)
Barton/Hack family
Birley family
Dummer family
Robin Fox acting family
Inglis family
Pares family
Thwaites family (brewers)
Veitch family (nurserymen)

Oceania

Hawaii
Kamehameha
Lunalilo
Kalākaua

French Polynesia
Huahine
Mangareva
Tahiti
Bora Bora

Samoa
Malietoa
Tui Manua
Tupua Tamasese

Tonga
Tonga

Religious

Abrahamic Religions 

 Abraham's family tree

Biblical
The Book of Genesis (Adam to the sons of Noah)
The Book of Genesis (Noah to the sons of Jacob)
The descendants of Levi, and ancestry of Moses
The Book of Ruth (Immediate ancestry of King David)
Kings of Israel and Judah
New Testament (Abraham to King David, patrilineage; King David to Jesus, two patrilineages)
Family tree of the Bible

Islamic (descendants of the Prophet and his companions)
Muhammad ibn 'Abdullah
Abu-Bakr ibn Abi-Quhafah
'Umar ibn Al-Khattab
'Uthman ibn 'Affan
'Ali ibn Abi-Talib
Family tree of Husayn ibn Ali and the Twelve Imams
List of the Alid Dynasties in the Islamic World
Umayyad
Hashemite Family current rulers of Jordan
the Alaouite family current rulers of Morocco
the Husainid Dynasty Beys and Kings of Tunis

Polytheistic
Sumerian gods
Babylonian gods
Greek gods
Japanese kami
Māori gods

Fictional

Tolkien
High-elf
House of Olwë, Elwë (Thingol), and Elmo
Half-elven
Line of the Half-elven
Dwarf
Durin's Folk family tree

Other
From books, movies, or TV series
 Niebelung genealogy the Nibelungenlied
 House of Telmar family tree - Chronicles of Narnia
 McDuck family tree - Donald Duck
 Ewing family tree - Dallas
 Crawley of Downton Abbey family tree

Star Wars (Movie)
 Skywalker family tree
 Solo family tree

Harry Potter (Book)
 Ron Weasley's family tree
 Lord Voldemort's family tree

A Song of Ice and Fire (Book)
House Stark family tree
House Lannister family tree

Dune (Book)
House Atreides family tree
House Corrino family tree
House Harkonnen family tree
House Vernius family tree

One Life to Live (TV series)
 Buchanan family tree
 Cramer family tree
 Lord family tree
 Riley family tree
 Wolek family tree

General Hospital (TV series)
 Corinthos family
 Cassadine family
 Hardy/Webber family
 Jerome family
 Quartermaine family
 Scorpio/Jones family
 Spencer family

Jin Yong's books
 Yang Guo's family tree - Condor Trilogy
 Guo Jing's family tree - Condor Trilogy
 Zhang Wuji's family tree - Condor Trilogy
 Lin Pingzhi's family tree - The Smiling, Proud Wanderer

See also
 Lists of office-holders

trees
Royal families